Huaneng may refer to:

China Huaneng Group, a Chinese state-owned power generation conglomerate
Huaneng Power International, listed subsidiary of China Huaneng Group
Huaneng Renewables, listed subsidiary of China Huaneng Group